Ovid Tzeng (born 8 September 1944) is a Taiwanese politician. He was Minister of Education from 2000 to 2002 and Minister of the Council for Cultural Affairs from 2011 to 2012.

References

1944 births
Living people
Presidents of universities and colleges in Taiwan
Taiwanese Ministers of Culture
Taiwanese Ministers of Education
National Chengchi University alumni